Elina Löwensohn (born 11 July 1966) is a Romanian-American actress. She had roles in the films Simple Men (1992), Schindler's List (1993), Amateur (1994), Nadja (1994) and The Wisdom of Crocodiles (1998).

Life and career
Löwensohn was born in Bucharest, Romania. After the death of her father, a Holocaust survivor, her mother emigrated to the United States with her, where her mother went on a hunger strike to get a visa for her.

After finishing high school, Löwensohn studied acting in New York City and played in several successful theatre productions. She started her film career in 1991 with Theory of Achievement. Some of her notable roles are Diana Reiter in Schindler's List (1993), Katya in the 1994 Seinfeld episode "The Gymnast", Iris in Six Ways to Sunday (1997), and Anne Levels in The Wisdom of Crocodiles (1998).

Filmography

Film

Television

References

External links

1966 births
Romanian Jews
American film actresses
Actresses from Bucharest
Romanian emigrants to the United States
Living people
20th-century American actresses
21st-century American actresses